Persicula calculus is a species of sea snail, a marine gastropod mollusk, in the family Cystiscidae.

References

Cystiscidae
Calculus
Gastropods described in 1870